Alireza Ramezani may refer to:

 Alireza Ramezani (footballer, born 1984), Iranian football midfielder who plays for Malavan
 Alireza Ramezani (footballer, born 1993), Iranian football player who plays for Esteghlal